The DR class was a diesel locomotive built by Ruston & Hornsby for Shell in 1954. Shell used it at their Clyde Refinery before it was sold in 1964 to the Commonwealth Railways. It was withdrawn in 1975 and stored at Port Augusta until 1987 when it was sold to the Richmond Vale Railway Museum.

References

Notes

Bibliography

B locomotives
Commonwealth Railways diesel locomotives
Railway locomotives introduced in 1953
Ruston & Hornsby locomotives
Standard gauge locomotives of Australia